Matthew Collins,  is a Niels Bohr Professor at the University of Copenhagen  and McDonald Professor in Palaeoproteomics at Cambridge University.

Prior to joining Cambridge he was professor of biomolecular archaeology at the University of York where he founded BioArCh, a collaboration between the departments of biology, chemistry and archaeology  (BioArCh: Biology Archaeology, Chemistry).

His research focuses on the persistence of proteins in ancient samples, using modelling to explore the racemization of amino acids and thermal history to predict the survival of DNA and other molecules. Using a combination of approaches (including immunology and protein mass spectrometry) his research detects and interprets protein remnants in archaeological and fossil remains.

With former PhD student Mike Buckley he developed ZooMS (Zooarchaeology by Mass Spectrometry) a way to rapidly identify bone and other collagen based materials using peptide mass fingerprinting.

In 2014 he was elected a Fellow of the British Academy, the United Kingdom's national academy for the humanities and social sciences.

References

Year of birth missing (living people)
Living people
British archaeologists
Fellows of the British Academy
Academics of the University of York
Members of the Royal Swedish Academy of Sciences